"Up All Night" is a song by American singer-songwriter Khalid. It was released as a single through RCA Records on November 14, 2019. Khalid wrote the song with producers Digi and Chrome Sparks.

Background
In a statement, Khalid said that he wrote "Up All Night" while he was on his Free Spirit World Tour:"Up All Night" is a song that I wrote while on tour. It's really special to me and I'm so excited that I am able to share it with my fans so quickly. I've been touring around the world, and interacting with my fans each night has been really inspiring. I'm working hard on some more new music to share with you guys soon!

Before the release of the song, Khalid sent it to his mother via text message. She wrote: "I love the energy the song gives me!". Khalid jokingly replied: "Makes me wanna do the running man".

Composition and lyrics
"Up All Night" is an "ethereal R&B jam" that is set in the key of C major. Lyrically, rather than Khalid's usual songs about relationships, he uses the song to be more introspective about his life and the thoughts that keep him up all night. A "mellow" song, he "sings over a spare, bouncy beat" before the song rises even further: "Take me around the world and back again / As I'm searching for my soul out there / Oh, there's something that I'm wondering / Where I'm going when my story ends". He uses falsetto in the chorus: "Keeps me up all night / Keeps me / Get these thoughts that keep me up all night / Keeps me / Keeps me up all night / Keeps me".

Charts

Certifications

References

2019 singles
2019 songs
Khalid (singer) songs
Songs written by Khalid (singer)
RCA Records singles